Sebastian Stempfl (died April 12, 1418) was the bishop of Brixen, a part of the Holy Roman Empire. On June 23, 1417, he was elected as a bishop to succeed Bishop Ulrich Prustl, without any aristocratic influence which was rather rare at the time.

Life 
Sebastian Stempfl was born to a father who was a judge in Taisten in Puister Valley. After finishing elementary education in Taisten, Sebastian went to study in Vienna and Bologna.

In 1399 he received a canonry in Brixen and became the dean of the San Candido collegiate church in 1404. His next promotion was as the dean of the Brixen cathedral.

Bishop election 
Sebastian Stempfl was elected as a Bishop of the Holy Roman Empire on the 23rd of June 1417 in the Brixen cathedral. The Brixen cathedral’s chapter elected him to succeed Bishop Ulrich Prustl without the influence of aristocracy or any regional prince.

Archbishop of Salzburg confirmed the election, although a consecration by the Pope was impossible at the time due to religious schism.

Death 
Despite his success at being promoted among the Catholic ranks, Bishop Sebastian Stempfl had an untimely death in 1418 which put a quick end to his short reign and he was buried in the Brixen Cathedral.

References 

Bishops of Brixen

14th-century births

1418 deaths

Year of birth unknown